Banphool  is a 1971 Indian Hindi-language romance film, produced by Harish Upadyaya and C.D. Shah under the Filmlands banner and directed by Vijay Bhatt. Starring Jeetendra, Babita, Shatrughan Sinha  and music composed by Laxmikant Pyarelal. It has a hit dance song "Aahein na bhar thandi thandi, garam garam chai pee le, zara meri chai pee le".

Plot
Haria lives with his widowed and elderly grandmother at a tea estate. He has no knowledge of his biological father, as his mother died at the time of his birth. He now works as a Mahout (Elephant driver) at the tea estate, with elephant-friend, Raja. He meets and falls in love with a gypsy girl, Gulabi, and both want to get married. But Gulabi has another suitor, none other than Ajay, the only son of the tea estate owner. When Ajay finds out that Gulabi loves Haria, he plans to get rid of Haria but fails. He waits for the right moment and has his men abduct Gulabi. But before he could have his way with her, she is rescued by Raja, but Ajay subsequently shoots Raja to death. An enraged Haria wants to kill Ajay in return, but Ajay's dad stops him from doing so. Then Ajay's dad finds out a secret about his past life and decides to change his last will and testament. Ajay finds out about this and lays in wait with a shotgun to kill his very own father - and anyone else who dares to stand in his way.

Cast

Jeetendra as Haria
Babita Kapoor as Gulabi
Shatrughan Sinha as Ajay
Asrani as Vaidyaraj Tej Bahadur 
Ramesh Deo as Jagdish 
Durga Khote as Haria's maternal grandma
Kanhaiyalal as Muninji
Sunder as Panchhilal
Hari Shivdasani as Radhakant 
Kamaldeep as Jagga  
Purnima as Nirmala 
Seema Deo as Janki
Shabnam as Munim's Wife 
Rirkoo   
Laxmi Patel as Chamki

Soundtrack
Lyrics by: Anand Bakshi

References

External links
 

1971 films
1970s Hindi-language films
1970s romance films
Films scored by Laxmikant–Pyarelal
Films directed by Vijay Bhatt
Indian romance films
Hindi-language romance films